United Nations Security Council resolution 963, adopted unanimously on 29 November 1994, after examining the application of the Republic of Palau for membership in the United Nations, the Council recommended to the General Assembly that Palau be admitted.

On 15 December 1994, the General Assembly admitted the Republic of Palau under Resolution 49/63.

See also
 United Nations Security Council Resolution 956
 Member states of the United Nations
 List of United Nations Security Council Resolutions 901 to 1000 (1994–1995)

References

External links
 
Text of the Resolution at undocs.org

 0963
 0963
1994 in Palau
 0963
November 1994 events